EGC may refer to:
 Bergerac Dordogne Périgord Airport, in France
 E. Gluck Corporation, an American watch company
 East Greenland Current
 Église Gnostique Catholique, a French Gnostic church organisation
 Ecclesia Gnostica Catholica, a Gnostic church organization
 El Nasr Girls' College, in Alexandria, Egypt
 Electrical Guitar Company, an American guitar company
 Embryonic germ cell
 Eosinophilic granuloma complex
 Equipment Ground Conductor, equipment bonding conductor
 European Green Coordination, a predecessor of the European Green Party
 Epigallocatechin
 European Gliding Championships
 European Go Championship, or European Go Congress
 General Court (European Union)